Jalsen Reservoir is a famous  pond in Hindaun City, Hindaun Block in Rajasthan, India. It is cover  reservoir (pond) area. It is located Central in the Hindaun, in the Hindaun Block. It is the most famous pond of Hindaun. Rastriya park in North, SH-1,SH-22 in West, Ramlila maidan in Naurth-East and Nakkash Ki Devi - Gomti Dham in East of Jalsen.

References

Ponds of India
Hindaun Block